The Sachsenwall (German for "Saxon rampart, "Saxon wall or "Saxon embankment") may refer to:

 the remains of a more-than-1500-year-old granite wall on the Hexentanzplatz near Thale in the Harz Mountains of Germany.
 the Limes Saxoniae, a Saxon defensive dyke in Schleswig Holstein, North Germany
 a former rampart system around Marienburg Castle in Lower Saxony, North Germany